The 2005 European Cup Winter Throwing was held on 12 and 13 March at Macit Özcan Sports Complex in Mersin, Turkey. It was the fifth edition of the athletics competition for throwing events organised by the European Athletics Association. A total of 174 athletes from 29 countries entered the competition. It was the first time that the competition was held with the Cup name, changing from the European Winter Throwing Challenge moniker it had since its initial edition in 2001.

The competition featured men's and women's contests in shot put, discus throw, javelin throw and hammer throw. Athletes were seeded into "A" and "B" groups in each competition. Lada Chernova of Russia was the sole "B" seeded athlete to take a medal, finishing as runner-up in the women's javelin throw.

Russia was easily the best performing nation of the tournament, taking the men's and women's titles on points and having the most medals, with three of each colour. Germany was runner-up in both men's and women's divisions and had the next most medals with one gold medal and three bronze.

Women's hammer bronze medallist Olga Kuzenkova was retrospectively found to be doping around 2004 to 2005, but due to limitations of retesting her disqualification was only for the period of August 2005 to 2007 and her mark in Mersin still stands.

Medal summary

Men

Women

Medal and points table

Participation

References

Results
5th European Cup Winter Throwing Results. RFEA. Retrieved on 2013-11-16.
Euro Chall  Mersin  TUR  12 - 13 March. Tilastopaja. Retrieved on 2013-11-16.

External links
Official website (archived)

European Throwing Cup
European Cup Winter Throwing
International athletics competitions hosted by Turkey
2005 in European sport
European Cup Winter Throwing
Sport in Mersin